The northern fantail (Rhipidura rufiventris) is a species of bird in the family Rhipiduridae.
It is found in New Guinea and northern Australia (Broome to Shire of Burdekin).
Its natural habitats are subtropical or tropical moist lowland forests and subtropical or tropical mangrove forests. The Biak fantail (R. kordensis) was formerly considered a subspecies.

References

northern fantail
Birds of Timor
Birds of the Maluku Islands
Birds of New Guinea
Birds of the Northern Territory
Birds of Cape York Peninsula
northern fantail
Taxa named by Louis Jean Pierre Vieillot
Taxonomy articles created by Polbot